Lick Branch is a stream in Cooper County in the U.S. state of Missouri. It is a tributary of Petite Saline Creek.

Lick Branch was named for mineral licks near its course.

See also
List of rivers of Missouri

References

Rivers of Cooper County, Missouri
Rivers of Missouri